The 1912 United States presidential election in North Dakota took place on November 5, 1912, as part of the 1912 United States presidential election. Voters chose five representatives, or electors, to the Electoral College, who voted for president and vice president.

North Dakota was won by Princeton University President Woodrow Wilson (D–Virginia), running with governor of Indiana Thomas R. Marshall, with 34.14% of the popular vote, against the 26th president of the United States Theodore Roosevelt (P–New York), running with governor of California Hiram Johnson, with 29.71% of the popular vote, the 27th president of the United States William Howard Taft (R–Ohio), running with Columbia University President Nicholas Murray Butler, with 26.67% of the popular vote and the five-time candidate of the Socialist Party of America for President of the United States Eugene V. Debs (S–Indiana), running with the first Socialist mayor of a major city in the United States, Emil Seidel, with 8.05% of the popular vote.

As a result of his win in the state, Wilson became the first Democratic presidential candidate to win North Dakota. He would later win the state again four years later. This election marks the last time four different candidates won at least one county within one individual state. This feat would be shared by Kansas in the same election.

Results

Results by county

See also
 United States presidential elections in North Dakota

References

North Dakota
1912
1912 North Dakota elections